Associated Grocers of the South  was founded in 1927 by 13 local grocery store owners from Birmingham, Alabama, in the United States. Led by Larry Grimes, they chose to establish a retailers' cooperative to compete against the emerging chain stores. The company serves 300 independent grocers in Alabama, Mississippi, Georgia, Tennessee and Florida. It distributes the Shurfine brand private label and is a member-owner of Topco Associates LLC.

External links 
 Associated Grocers of the South web site

Companies based in Birmingham, Alabama
Economy of the Southeastern United States
American companies established in 1927
Retail companies established in 1927
Supermarkets of the United States
Retailers' cooperatives in the United States
1927 establishments in Alabama